Anne Ogborn (born 1959) is a transgender rights activist from Salina, Kansas. According to Patrick Califia she "should be credited as a forerunner of transgender direct action groups." She is a software engineer known for her contributions to SWI-Prolog.

Transgender activism 
Ogborn was an early practitioner of direct action in support of transgender rights.  For instance, in 1991, transsexual woman Nancy Burkholder was expelled from the Michigan Womyn's Music Festival, a preeminent lesbian event.  Ogborn coordinated a direct action, Camp Trans, to protest the transphobia of the festival leaders.

The first transsexual organization that Ogborn founded was KCGS, the Kansas City Gender Society.  Ogborn started Transgender Nation, the transgender focus group of Queer Nation in San Francisco which included a new transgender caucus to fight transphobia in local debates. In 1993, Ogborn and Transgender Nation members protested the American Psychiatric Association's listing of transsexualism as a psychiatric disorder, and medical colonization of transsexual people's lives.

Ogborn was an early participant and organizer of the New Womens Conference, a retreat for post-operative transsexual women. She edited its newsletter, "Rights of Passage", which would later become the Transsexual News Telegraph. Her involvement with the New Womens Conference informed much of her later work.

Ogborn joined the Hijra community in 1994, claiming to be the first westerner to join the religious out-group.

She continues her activism for transgender and human rights.

See also 
 Gay pride
 Queer
 Queer Nation
 San Francisco
 Transphobia

References 

Hijra (South Asia) people
American LGBT rights activists
Living people
Transgender women
1959 births
People from Salina, Kansas
Transgender rights activists
Transgender writers
Women in computing
21st-century LGBT people